Dudley Adrian Conroy Ryder, 8th Earl of Harrowby, DL (known as Conroy born 18 March 1951) is a British peer. He was known by the courtesy title of Viscount Sandon from 1987 until 2007.

Biography

Conroy Ryder was born on 18 March 1951. He is the only son of Dudley Ryder, 7th Earl of Harrowby, by his marriage to Jeanette Rosalthe Johnston-Saint. His sister is Lady Rosalthé Frances Rundall.

Harrowby was educated at Eton, the University of Newcastle upon Tyne, and Magdalene College, Cambridge.  He became a director of Compton Street Securities in 1988.

Harrowby succeeded to the earldom on the death of his father on 9 October 2007, when he retired from his job and relocated to manage the family seat, Sandon Hall in Staffordshire, England. The family also owns Burnt Norton House, made famous by T. S. Eliot's Four Quartets.

Harrowby was appointed as a Deputy Lieutenant of Staffordshire on 9 May 2017.

Marriages & Children
Harrowby was married firstly to Sarah Nichola Hobhouse Payne, daughter of Captain Anthony Denys Phillpotts Payne, on 16 July 1977.  They had four children:

 Dudley Anthony Hugo Coventry Ryder, Viscount Sandon (born 5 September 1981), heir apparent to the earldom
 Hon Frederick Whitmore Dudley Ryder (born 6 February 1984)
 Hon Henry Mansell Dudley Ryder (born 13 July 1985)
 Lady Emily Georgina Hobhouse Ryder (born 13 January 1992)
Sarah died 29 December 1994. 
Harrowby was married secondly to Caroline Marks on 2 May 1998.

Notes

References 

1951 births
Living people
People educated at Eton College
Alumni of Newcastle University
Alumni of Magdalene College, Cambridge
Deputy Lieutenants of Staffordshire
Earls of Harrowby
Conroy